The history of the Jews in the Roman Empire traces the interaction of Jews and  Romans during the period of the Roman Empire (27 BCE – CE 476). A Jewish diaspora had migrated to Rome and to the territories of Roman Europe from the land of Israel, Anatolia, Babylon and Alexandria in response to economic hardship and incessant warfare over the land of Israel between the Ptolemaic and Seleucid empires from the 4th to the 1st centuries BCE. In Rome, Jewish communities thrived economically. Jews became a significant part of the Roman Empire's population in the first century CE, with some estimates as high as 7 million people; however, this estimation has been questioned.

Roman general Pompey conquered Jerusalem and its surroundings by 63 BCE. The Romans deposed the ruling Hasmonean dynasty of Judaea (in power from  140 BCE) and the Roman Senate declared Herod the Great "King of the Jews" in  40 BCE. Judea proper, Samaria and Idumea became the Roman province of Iudaea in 6 CE. Jewish–Roman tensions resulted in several Jewish–Roman wars between the years 66 and 135 CE, which resulted in the  destruction of Jerusalem and the Second Temple and the institution of the Jewish Tax in 70 (those who paid the tax were exempt from the obligation of making sacrifices to the Roman imperial cult).

Emperor Hadrian attempted to create a new colony, named Aelia Capitolina, in the area of then-razed Jerusalem,  130. Also in the course of the 1st and 2nd centuries CE, Christianity began to develop from Second Temple Judaism. In 313, Constantine and Licinius issued the Edict of Milan giving official recognition to Christianity as a legal religion. Constantine the Great moved the Roman capital from Rome to Constantinople ("New Rome")  330, sometimes considered the start of the Byzantine Empire, and with the Edict of Thessalonica in 380, Christianity became the state church of the Roman Empire. The Christian emperors persecuted their Jewish subjects and restricted their rights.

Jews in Rome

According to the article on Rome in The Jewish Encyclopedia, 

The Jewish Encyclopedia connects the two civil wars raging during the last decades of the first century BCE, one in Judea between the two Hasmonean brothers Hyrcanus II and Aristobulus II, and one in the Roman republic between Julius Caesar and Pompey, and describes the evolution of the Jewish population in Rome:

Even before Rome annexed Judea as a province, the Romans had interacted with Jews from their diasporas settled in Rome for a century and a half. Many cities of the Roman provinces in the eastern Mediterranean contained very large Jewish communities, dispersed from the time of the sixth century BCE.

Rome's involvement in the Eastern Mediterranean dated from 63 BCE, following the end of the Third Mithridatic War, when Rome made Syria a province. After the defeat of Mithridates VI of Pontus, the proconsul Pompeius Magnus (Pompey the Great) remained to secure the area, including a visit to the Jerusalem Temple. The former king Hyrcanus II was confirmed as ethnarch of the Jews by Julius Caesar in 48 BC. In 37 BC, the Herodian Kingdom was established as a Roman client kingdom and in 6 CE parts became a province of the Roman Empire, named Iudaea Province.

In the Greek cities in the east of the Roman empire, tensions often arose between the Greek and Jewish populations. Writing around 90 CE, the Jewish author Josephus cited decrees by Julius Caesar, Mark Antony, Augustus and Claudius, endowing Jewish communities with a number of rights. Central privileges included the right to be exempted from polis religious rituals and the permission "to follow their ancestral laws, customs and religion". Jews were also exempted from military service and the provision of Roman troops. Contrary to what Josephus wants his readers to believe, the Jews did not have the status of religio licita (permitted religion) as this status did not exist in the Roman empire, nor were all Roman decrees concerning the Jews positive. Instead, the regulations were made as a response to individual requests to the emperor. The decrees were deployed by Josephus "as instruments in an ongoing political struggle for status".

Because of their one-sided viewpoint, the authenticity of the decrees has been questioned many times, but they are now thought to be largely authentic. Still, Josephus gave only one side of the story by leaving out negative decisions and pretending that the rulings were universal. This way, he carried out an ideological message showing that the Romans allowed the Jews to carry out their own customs and rituals; the Jews were protected in the past and were still protected by these decisions in his own time.

The efforts of Caligula to install a statue of himself in the Temple (37–41 CE), which required the intervention of Philo of Alexandria and Herod Agrippa to prevent, has been proposed as the "first open break between Rome and the Jews"; although problems were already evident during the Census of Quirinius in 6 CE and under Sejanus (before 31 CE). The emperor Tiberius rectified the latter by intervening and ultimately recalling Pontius Pilate to Rome.

Jewish–Roman wars

In 66 CE, the First Jewish–Roman War began. The revolt was put down by the future Roman emperors Vespasian and Titus. In the Siege of Jerusalem in 70 CE, the Romans destroyed much of the Temple in Jerusalem and, according to some accounts, plundered artifacts from the Temple, such as the Menorah. Yohanan ben Zakkai, who opposed the war, negotiated with Vespasian for the safety of he and his supporters. Impressed by Yohanan's bravery and (ultimately correct) prediction that Vespasian would one day be Emperor, he granted them safe passage to and the right to settle in Yavneh, which as a result would go on to become an important cultural center of Jewish life in the Empire.

Jews continued to live in their land in significant numbers, the Kitos War of 115–117 notwithstanding, until Julius Severus ravaged Judea while putting down the Bar Kokhba revolt of 132–136. 985 villages were destroyed and most of the Jewish population of central Judaea was essentially wiped out – killed, sold into slavery, or forced to flee. Banished from Jerusalem, which was renamed Aelia Capitolina, the Jewish population now centered on Galilee, initially at Yavneh.

After the Jewish-Roman wars (66–135), Hadrian changed the name of Iudaea province to Syria Palaestina and Jerusalem to Aelia Capitolina in an alleged attempt to erase the historical ties of the Jewish people to the region. Though other explanations have also been proposed, and an alternative theory is that the renaming efforts preceded and helped precipitate the rebellion.
In addition, after 70, Jews and Jewish Proselytes were only allowed to practice their religion if they paid the Jewish tax, and after 135 were barred from Jerusalem except for the day of Tisha B'Av.

The diaspora

A Jewish diaspora existed for several centuries before the fall of the Second Temple, and their dwelling in other countries for the most part  was not a result of compulsory dislocation. Before the middle of the first century CE, in addition to Judea, Syria and Babylonia, large Jewish communities existed in the Roman provinces of Egypt, Crete and Cyrenaica, and in Rome itself; after the Siege of Jerusalem in 63 BCE, when the Hasmonean kingdom became a protectorate of Rome, emigration intensified.
Many Jews became citizens of other parts of the Roman Empire. Josephus, the book of Acts in the New Testament, as well as other Pauline texts, make frequent reference to the large populations of Hellenised Jews in the cities of the Roman world.
It is commonly claimed that the diaspora began with Rome's twofold crushing of Jewish national aspirations. David Aberbach, for one, has argued that much of the European Jewish diaspora, by which he means exile or voluntary migration, originated with the Jewish wars which occurred between 66 and 135 CE. Martin Goodman states that it is only after the destruction of Jerusalem that Jews are found in northern Europe and along the western Mediterranean coast. This widespread popular belief holds that there was a sudden expulsion of Jews from Judea/Syria Palaestina and that this was crucial for the establishment of the diaspora. Israel Bartal contends that Shlomo Sand is incorrect in ascribing this view to most Jewish study scholars, instead arguing that this view is negligible among serious Jewish study scholars. These scholars argue that the growth of diaspora Jewish communities was a gradual process that occurred over the centuries, starting with the Assyrian destruction of Israel, the Babylonian destruction of Judah, the Roman destruction of Judea, and the subsequent rule of Christians and Muslims. After the revolt, the Jewish religious and cultural center shifted to the Babylonian Jewish community and its scholars. For the generations that followed, the destruction of the Second Temple event came to represent a fundamental insight about the Jews who had become a dispossessed and persecuted people for much of their history. Following the Bar Kokhba revolt Jews were reduced to a completely diaspora people.

Erich S. Gruen maintains that focusing on the destruction of the Temple misses the point that already before this, the diaspora was well established. Compulsory dislocation of people cannot explain more than a fraction of the eventual diaspora. Avrum Ehrlich also states that already well before the destruction of the Temple in 70 CE, more Jews lived in the Diaspora than in Israel. Jonathan Adelman estimated that around 60% of Jews lived in the diaspora during the Second Temple period.
Of critical importance to the reshaping of Jewish tradition from the Temple-based religion to the traditions of the Diaspora was the development of the interpretations of the Torah found in the Mishnah and Talmud.

Late Roman period

In spite of the failure of the Bar Kokhba revolt, Jews remained in the land of Israel in significant numbers. The Jews who remained there went through numerous experiences and armed conflicts against consecutive occupiers of the Land. Some of the most famous and important Jewish texts were composed in Israeli cities at this time. The Jerusalem Talmud, the completion of the Mishnah and the system of niqqud are examples.

In this period the tannaim and amoraim were active rabbis who organized and debated the Jewish oral law. A major catalyst in Judaism is Judah haNasi, who was a wealthy rabbi and one of the last tannaim, oral interpreters of the Law. He was in good standing with Roman authority figures, which aided in his ascent to being the Patriarch of the Jewish community in Palestine. The decisions of the tannaim are contained in the Mishnah, Beraita, Tosefta, and various Midrash compilations. The Mishnah was completed shortly after 200 CE, probably by Judah haNasi. The commentaries of the amoraim upon the Mishnah are compiled in the Jerusalem Talmud, which was completed around 400 CE, probably in Tiberias.

In 351, the Jewish population in Sepphoris, under the leadership of Patricius, started a revolt against the rule of Constantius Gallus, brother-in-law of Emperor Constantius II. The revolt was eventually subdued by Gallus' general, Ursicinus.

According to tradition, in 359 Hillel II created the Hebrew calendar, which is a lunisolar calendar based on math rather than observation. Until then, the entire Jewish community outside the land of Israel depended on the observational calendar sanctioned by the Sanhedrin; this was necessary for the proper observance of the Jewish holy days. However, danger threatened the participants in that sanction and the messengers who communicated their decisions to distant communities. As the religious persecutions continued, Hillel determined to provide an authorized calendar for all time to come that was not dependent on observation at Jerusalem.

Julian, the only emperor to reject Christianity after the conversion of Constantine, allowed the Jews to return to "holy Jerusalem which you have for many years longed to see rebuilt" and to rebuild the Temple. However Julian was killed in battle on 26 June 363 in his failed campaign against the Sassanid Empire, and the Third Temple was not rebuilt at that time.

During the Byzantine–Sasanian War of 602–628 many Jews sided against the Eastern Roman Empire in the Jewish revolt against Heraclius, which successfully assisted the invading Persian Sassanids in conquering all of Roman Egypt and Syria. In reaction to this further anti-Jewish measures were enacted throughout the Eastern Roman realm and as far away as Merovingian France. Soon thereafter, 634, the Muslim conquests began, during which many Jews initially rose up again against their Eastern Roman rulers.

Dispersion of the Jews in the Roman Empire

Following the 1st-century Great Revolt and the 2nd-century Bar Kokhba revolt, the destruction of Judea exerted a decisive influence upon the dispersion of the Jewish people throughout the world, as the center of worship shifted from the Temple to Rabbinic authority.

Some Jews were sold as slaves or transported as captives after the fall of Judea, others joined the existing diaspora, while still others remained in Judea and began work on the Jerusalem Talmud. The Jews in the diaspora were generally accepted into the Roman Empire, but with the rise of Christianity, restrictions grew. Forced expulsions and persecution resulted in substantial shifts in the international centers of Jewish life to which far-flung communities often looked, although not always unified, due to the Jewish people's dispersion itself. Jewish communities were thereby largely expelled from Judea and sent to various Roman provinces in the Middle East, Europe and North Africa. The Roman Jewry came to develop a character associated with the urban middle class in the modern age.

See also

 Jewish diaspora
 Jewish ethnic divisions
 Jewish history
 History of the Jews in the Byzantine Empire
 History of the Jews in Egypt
History of the Jews in Italy
History of the Jews in Calabria
History of the Jews in Livorno
History of the Jews in Naples
History of the Jews in Sicily
History of the Jews in Trieste
History of the Jews in Turin
History of the Jews in Venice
 History of the Jews and Judaism in the Land of Israel
 History of the Jews in Syria
 Italian Jews

References

Further reading
 Barclay, John M. G. 1996. Jews in the Mediterranean Diaspora from Alexander to Trajan (323 B.C.E.–117 C.E.). Edinburgh: T. & T. Clark.
 Goodman, Martin. 2000. State and Society in Roman Galilee, A.D. 132–212. London and Portland, OR: Vallentine Mitchell.
 Goodman, M. 2004. "Trajan and the Origins of Roman Hostility to the Jews." Past & Present 182: 3–29.
 Mclaren, James S. 2013. "The Jews in Rome during the Flavian Period." Antichthon 47:156–172.
 Pucci Ben Zeev, Miriam. 1998. Jewish Rights in the Roman World: The Greek and Roman Documents Quoted by Josephus Flavius. Tübingen, Germany: Mohr.
 Rutgers, Leonard Victor. 2000. The Jews in Late Ancient Rome: Evidence of Cultural Interaction in the Roman Diaspora. Leiden, The Netherlands: Brill.
 Schürer, Emil. 1973. The History of the Jewish People in the Time of Jesus Christ (175 B.C.–135 A.D.). Revised and edited by Emil Schürer, Géza Vermès, Fergus Millar, Matthew Black, and Martin Goodman. 2 vols. Edinburgh: T. & T. Clark.
 Smallwood, E. Mary. 1976. The Jews under Roman Rule. Leiden, The Netherlands: Brill.
 Stern, Menahem, ed. 1974. Greek and Latin Authors on Jews and Judaism. 3 vols. Jerusalem: Israel Academy of Sciences and Humanities.
 Varhelyi, Zsuzsanna. 2000. "Jews in Civic Life under the Roman Empire." Acta antiqua Academiae Scientiarum Hungaricae 40.1/4:471-478.
 Weitzmann, Kurt, ed. 1979.  Age of Spirituality: Late Antique and Early Christian Art, Third to Seventh Century. New York: The Museum.

Roman
Roman
 
Roman